Live from Soundscape may refer to:

 Live from Soundscape (Material album)
 Live from Soundscape (Sun Ra album)